Charles Storer (born 29 March 1891) was an English professional footballer who played for Bradford City and Hartlepool United. He was born in Ibstock.

He signed for Bradford City along with fellow Gresley players Sol Tremelling and George Draycott for a combined fee of £150.

References

1891 births
Year of death missing
English footballers
Bradford City A.F.C. players
Hartlepool United F.C. players
English Football League players
People from Ibstock
Footballers from Leicestershire
Association footballers not categorized by position